{{DISPLAYTITLE:C3H5}}
The molecular formula C3H5 (molar mass: 41.07 g/mol, exact mass: 41.0391 u) may refer to:

 Allyl group
 Cyclopropyl group